Trimont is a city in Martin County, Minnesota, United States. The population was 747 at the 2010 census. The U.S. Census Bureau estimated 2018 population is 704. Interstate 90 is nearby.

Trimont was once two different towns, platted by competing railroads. The two towns were Triumph, to the east, and Monterey to the west. These towns joined, using the first letters in each town's name, to form what is today known as Trimont.  This gives Trimont the unique characteristic of two separate Main Street business districts which are on the same street, yet placed approximately a half-mile apart.

The yearly summer festival has been known as Town & Country Days, FunFest, and the Chocolate Festival.  In 2011, the planning committee decided to go back to the name FunFest.  Trimont FunFest is always held the second Saturday in July.  FunFest showcases local talent for its live entertainment, along with games, sporting competitions, contests, a silent auction, a parade, a community church service, and a variety of food.

Education

In 1988, Trimont Schools consolidated with neighboring Sherburn and Welcome to form the Martin County West (MCW) School District.  The Trimont school building is now the MCW Trimont Elementary. (Grades kindergarten, 3rd - 6th grades.)

Geography

Trimont was once two towns, Triumph and Monterey, but were combined by referendum in 1959 to become Trimont.

Demographics

2010 census
As of the census of 2010, there were 747 people, 310 households, and 186 families residing in the city. The racial makeup of the city was 97.9% White, 0.1% African American, 0.3% Native American, 0.3% Asian, 0.8% from other races, and 0.7% from two or more races. Hispanic or Latino of any race were 0.8% of the population.

There were 310 households, of which 30.6% had children under the age of 18 living with them, 46.1% were married couples living together, 8.7% had a female householder with no husband present, 5.2% had a male householder with no wife present, and 40.0% were non-families. 37.4% of all households were made up of individuals, and 21.3% had someone living alone who was 65 years of age or older. The average household size was 2.27 and the average family size was 2.99.

The median age in the city was 45.1 years. 24.8% of residents were under the age of 18; 5.8% were between the ages of 18 and 24; 19.1% were from 25 to 44; 25.8% were from 45 to 64; and 24.5% were 65 years of age or older. The gender makeup of the city was 46.7% male and 53.3% female.

2000 census
As of the census of 2000, there were 754 people, 322 households, and 199 families residing in the city. The racial makeup of the city was 98.01% White, 0.53% African American, 0.27% Native American, 0.13% Asian, and 1.06% from two or more races. Hispanic or Latino of any race were 0.40% of the population.

There were 322 households, out of which 27.0% had children under the age of 18 living with them, 52.5% were married couples living together, 8.4% had a female householder with no husband present, and 37.9% were non-families. 35.7% of all households were made up of individuals, and 20.5% had someone living alone who was 65 years of age or older.  The average household size was 2.22 and the average family size was 2.89.

In the city, the population was spread out, with 22.8% under the age of 18, 4.2% from 18 to 24, 21.5% from 25 to 44, 22.9% from 45 to 64, and 28.5% who were 65 years of age or older.  The median age was 46 years. For every 100 females, there were 83.5 males.  For every 100 females age 18 and over, there were 80.2 males.

The median income for a household in the city was $28,125, and the median income for a family was $40,000. Males had a median income of $30,682 versus $21,667 for females. The per capita income for the city was $19,819.  About 9.6% of families and 11.5% of the population were below the poverty line, including 11.4% of those under age 18 and 13.7% of those age 65 or over.

References

Cities in Martin County, Minnesota
Cities in Minnesota